People is a play by the English playwright Alan Bennett.

Cast and characters

Production history 
The play premiered in the Lyttelton Theatre at the National Theatre, London on 31 October 2012, running until 5 March 2013. The production was directed by Nicholas Hytner and designed by Bob Crowley and starred Frances de la Tour, Nicholas le Prevost, Peter Egan and Linda Bassett in the cast. The play was captured by National Theatre Live and broadcast to cinemas worldwide on 21 March 2013.

A UK tour starring Siân Phillips, Brigit Forsyth and Selina Cadell opened at the Birmingham Repertory Theatre from 3 to 21 September, before touring to Leicester Curve (24 to 28 September), Norwich Theatre Royal (1 – 5 October), Lowry Theatre, Salford (15 to 19 October), Marlowe Theatre, Canterbury (22 to 26 October), Milton Keynes Theatre (29 October to 2 November), Leeds Grand Theatre (5 to 9 November) ending at Plymouth Theatre Royal (12 to 16 November).

References

2012 plays
Plays by Alan Bennett